My Family is a 1995 American independent drama film directed by Gregory Nava, written by Nava and Anna Thomas, and starring Jimmy Smits, Edward James Olmos, and Esai Morales. The film depicts three generations of a Mexican American family who emigrated from Mexico and settled in East Los Angeles.

Plot
The story is narrated by the family's oldest son, Paco. The film begins with the father of the family, José Sanchez, making a journey that lasts one year on foot from Mexico to Los Angeles. He travels to Los Angeles to meet a distant relative known as El Californio, who was born in the city when it was still part of Mexico. They become fast friends and grow a corn farm together. However, after several years, El Californio nears death. Shortly before dying, El Californio says he wants the following written on his tombstone:
When I was born here, this was Mexico, and where my body lies, this is still Mexico.

José meets and marries the love of his life, María, an American citizen. After María is illegally deported to Mexico by the U.S. federal government in a mass roundup, she makes it back to Los Angeles via a long and arduous trip two years later, where she returns home with their new son Chucho.

Twenty years later in 1958 or 1959, eldest daughter Irene is getting married. Chucho and Paco have grown up. New additions to the family include Toni, Guillermo "Memo", and brother Jimmy.

The film begins to gain momentum after the wedding, when a series of events seal Chucho's fate. One night at a dance hall, Chucho is dancing with his girlfriend, when his rival Butch Mejia starts to bother him. This results in a bloody knife fight between the two, and Chucho accidentally kills him. After this event, Chucho becomes a fugitive of the police. One night when Jimmy is playing ball with his friends, Chucho is shot dead by the LAPD right in front of Jimmy. Other members of the family learn of Chucho's death when they hear gunshots and rush to a nearby street. As an ambulance arrives to take Chucho's lifeless body away, Paco narrates how Chucho's whole life had been on borrowed time.

The third generation, which takes place another twenty years later in the 1970s and 80s, faces situations such as acculturation, assimilation, and past problems of the family.

Jimmy completes a stint in prison and returns home. It is revealed that after Chucho's death 20 years back, Jimmy became an angry man following in his footsteps, becoming a fugitive like him. One day, Toni visits the Sanchez home and stuns her parents with the news that she is no longer a nun and has married a priest named David Ronconi. Toni and David become involved in helping political refugees. When they find out that a Salvadoran refugee, Isabel, has become a target for murder and is being held for deportation back to El Salvador, Toni convinces Jimmy to marry her so that she is able to stay in the U.S.

Jimmy is resistant to the idea of being a married man; however, Isabel slowly makes herself at home and Jimmy has no choice but to let her stay with him. As Jimmy works on his car listening to "I'm Your Puppet", Isabel comes up to him and changes the music in the cassette-player. She tries to get him to dance with her on the street. At first he doesn't want to, but she finally succeeds in teaching him some steps. He asks her at the end of the song, "Will you teach me how to salsa?" It is here that Jimmy finally lets Isabel into his heart and where they both understand that although other people don't understand them, they know now who they really are together and they finally consummate their marriage.

Isabel becomes pregnant shortly thereafter but unfortunately dies after giving birth to their son, Carlitos. Enraged, Jimmy attacks the doctor whom he blames for her death, burglarizes a store, and is jailed, leaving his son to be raised by his parents. When Jimmy gets out of prison 4 years later, he initially doesn't want anything to do with his son, who is a spirited, but trouble-making child. When Jimmy finally sees his son, he is filled with joy and immediately wants to care for him. However, his son hates him, who thinks his real father is a cattle rancher who lives in Texas. After Jimmy decides to change his life around for the good of his son, Carlitos accepts him and moves with him to Texas where Jimmy has secured a good-paying manufacturing job in San Antonio.

The film concludes with Jose and Maria, now empty nesters reminiscing about their past as Jose says "God has been good to us, we've been very lucky, and our life it has been very...very good" and the camera pans to a shot of Los Angeles.

Cast

 Jimmy Smits as Jimmy Sánchez
 Jonathan Hernandez as Young Jimmy Sánchez
 Edward James Olmos as Paco Sánchez
 Benito Martinez as Young Paco Sánchez
 Esai Morales as Jesus "Chucho" Sánchez
 Elpidia Carrillo as Isabel Magaña Sánchez
 Enrique Castillo as Guillermo "Memo" Sánchez
 Greg Albert as Young Memo Sánchez
 Rafael Cortés as Roberto Sánchez
 Michael DeLorenzo as Butch Mejia
 Constance Marie as Toni Sánchez
 Scott Bakula as David Ronconi

 Lupe Ontiveros as Irene Sánchez
 Maria Canals as Young Irene Sánchez
 León Singer as El Californio
 Mary Steenburgen as Gloria
 Dedee Pfeiffer as Karen Gillespie
 Bibi Besch as Mrs. Gillespie
 Bruce Gray as Mr. Gillespie
 Eduardo Lopez Rojas as Jose Sánchez
 Jacob Vargas as Young Jose Sánchez
 Jenny Gago as Maria Sánchez
 Jennifer Lopez as Young Maria Sánchez

Production
While the film was distributed by New Line Cinema, many production companies were involved in the making of the film, including: American Playhouse, Francis Ford Coppola's American Zoetrope, Majestic Films International, and Newcomb Productions. Gregory Nava has stated that the film has autobiographic overtones, but the film was more inspirational rather than specific. Nava says, "A lot of the specifics came from other families when I was doing research for the film in East Los Angeles." The final scene is duplicated shot-for-shot from the final scene of Satyajit Ray's 1959 film The World of Apu.

Filming
Filming began in 1994. The film was shot in both California and Mexico. In California, locations included Agoura Hills, Highland Park, Los Angeles and East Los Angeles. Mexican locations included Ocumicho, Patamba, and Pátzcuaro, which are all in the state of Michoacán.

Reception

Critical response
Reviews were generally positive. The film has a 79% "Fresh" rating at Rotten Tomatoes, based on 58 reviews from professional critics.

Roger Ebert, film critic for the Chicago Sun-Times, liked the direction of the film, and wrote, "Their story is told in images of startling beauty and great overflowing energy; it is rare to hear so much laughter from an audience that is also sometimes moved to tears. Few movies like this get made because few filmmakers have the ambition to open their arms wide and embrace so much life."

Film critics Frederic and Mary Ann Brussat, who write for the web based Spirituality and Practice, liked the film, the acting and the direction of the film. They wrote, "My Family is a touching and often mystical portrait of a multi-generational Mexican-American family in East Los Angeles...Director Gregory Nava (El Norte) does a fine job orchestrating the many events in this emotionally resonant drama."

But not all were so kind. Caryn James, in a film review in The New York Times wrote the film was "wildly uneven" and "offers a trite, overblown narration by Edward James Olmos and an often flagging sense of drama." She was also not happy with Nava's direction and wrote, "[Nava] seems so enamored of the texture of Mexican-American life that he glides past any sense of character." James however was very complimentary of Jimmy Smits' performance.

Awards and honors

Wins
 NCLR Bravo Award: NCLR Bravo Award; Outstanding Feature Film; 1995.
 Donostia-San Sebastián International Film Festival: OCIC Award, Gregory Nava; 1995.
 Young Artist Awards: Best Young Supporting Actor - Feature Film, Jonathan Hernandez; 1996.

Nominated
 Casting Society of America Awards: Best Casting for Feature Film, Best Casting for Drama Feature Film, Jane Jenkins, Janet Hirshenson, and Roger Mussenden; 1995.
 Donostia-San Sebastián International Film Festival: Golden Seashell; Gregory Nava; 1995.
 Academy Awards: Best Make-Up, Ken Diaz and Mark Sanchez; 1996.
 Independent Spirit Awards: Best Male Lead, Jimmy Smits; Best Supporting Female, Jennifer Lopez; 1996.

Distribution
My Family opened in the United States in wide release on May 3, 1995. In the United Kingdom it opened on October 6, 1995. The film was screened at a few film festivals including the Donostia-San Sebastián International Film Festival, Spain. Sales at the box-office were average. The first week's gross was $2,164,840 and the total receipts for the run were $11,079,373. It grossed just $0.4 million internationally for a worldwide total of $11.5 million. The budget of the film is estimated at $5,500,000.

A video was released April 8, 1997 and a DVD version was released on June 9, 2004 by New Line Home Video. A Spanish version video was also released.

Soundtrack
For the original motion picture soundtrack, the producers include a cross section of Latino music, including a merengue and a mambo. The song "Angel Baby" by Rosie and the Originals, is included as well, sung by Exposé vocalist Jeanette Jurado. In the movie, Jurado made a cameo appearance as Rosie Hamlin performing the song.

A CD was released on April 25, 1995, on the Nonesuch Records label. The CD contains 14 tracks including the main title theme written by Mark McKenzie and Pepe Avila. Gregory Nava wrote the liner notes for the CD. Composer Mark McKenzie also released Con Passione (2001), a CD that contains various compositions he has written for films including seven tracks for My Family.

Track listing

References

External links
 
 
 
 

1995 films
1995 drama films
1995 independent films
American Zoetrope films
1990s English-language films
Films about families
Films directed by Gregory Nava
Films set in Los Angeles
Films set in the 1950s
Films set in 1958
Films set in the 1970s
Films about Mexican Americans
Films about immigration to the United States
New Line Cinema films
1990s Spanish-language films
1995 multilingual films
American multilingual films